Marie de Lorraine may refer to one of the following;

Marie de Guise (1515–1560) mother of Mary, Queen of Scots
Marie de Lorraine, Duchess of Guise (1615–1688) daughter of Charles, Duke of Guise
Marie de Lorraine (1674–1724) daughter of Louis, Count of Armagnac, wife of Antonio I, Prince of Monaco